Hemidactylus kundaensis is a species of gecko. It is endemic to Guinea.

References

Hemidactylus
Reptiles described in 2012
Reptiles of West Africa
Endemic fauna of Guinea